The AN/ALQ-218 is an American airborne electronic warfare system, found on Northrop Grumman EA-6B Prowler and Boeing EA-18G Growler military aircraft.

Description
The AN/ALQ-218 is an airborne passive Radar warning receiver / electronic warfare support measures / electronic intelligence (RWR/ESM/ELINT) sensor system designed for airborne situational awareness and signal intelligence gathering. The AN/ALQ-218 detects, identifies, locates and analyzes sources of radio frequency emission. The current version AN/ALQ-218(V)2 is manufactured by Northrop Grumman.

Platforms
The ALQ-218 is the featured system aboard the U.S. Navy's EA-18 Growler aircraft, which has replaced the EA-6B Prowler in the U.S. Navy.  Electronics from the EA-6B were modified to fit into the gun bay and wing tip pods of the Growler.

The EA-18G may carry an additional five jamming pods on under wing pylons.  The system is being considered for modification to serve on unmanned aerial vehicles. The Growler is part of the same family of aircraft as the F/A-18 Super Hornet.

References

External links

Electronic warfare equipment